Rudolf Karleček is a male former international table tennis player from Czechoslovakia.

Table tennis career
He won a gold medal in the men's team event at the 1939 World Table Tennis Championships for Czechoslovakia.

See also
 List of table tennis players
 List of World Table Tennis Championships medalists

References

Czech male table tennis players
World Table Tennis Championships medalists